Grant Leslie Smith (born 20 April 1971 in Canberra, Australian Capital Territory) is a former field hockey player from Australia, who was a member of the Men's National Hockey Team that won the bronze medal at the 1996 Summer Olympics in Atlanta, Georgia.

References

External links
 

1971 births
Living people
Australian male field hockey players
Olympic field hockey players of Australia
Field hockey players at the 1996 Summer Olympics
Olympic bronze medalists for Australia
Sportspeople from Canberra
Olympic medalists in field hockey
Medalists at the 1996 Summer Olympics